Angraecum infundibulare is a species of orchid.

infundibulare